British Raj, or British Rule, was the rule of the British Empire in the Indian subcontinent between 1858 and 1947.

British Rule may also refer to:
British Rule (card game), variation to the rules of card games

See also
British Empire
English rule (disambiguation)